Orphinus is a genus of beetles in the family Dermestidae, the skin beetles. The genus is distributed in Africa, Asia, and the Australian region, especially in tropical areas; at least one species is cosmopolitan. There are about 88 species.

Species include:

 Orphinus aethiops Arrow, 1915
 Orphinus affinis Reitter, 1881
 Orphinus africanus Pic, 1927
 Orphinus apicalis Pic, 1918
 Orphinus apicebrunneus Háva, 2003
 Orphinus atrofasciatus Pic, 1916
 Orphinus atrous Armstrong, 1943
 Orphinus australicus Blackburn, 1891
 Orphinus bicolor Pic, 1954
 Orphinus biflexus Reitter, 1881
 Orphinus binotatus Pic, 1937
 Orphinus bipunctutus Matsumura & Yokoyama, 1928
 Orphinus biroi Pic, 1956
 Orphinus casuarinae Blackburn, 1903
 Orphinus ceciliense Blackburn, 1903
 Orphinus chinensis Háva, 2004
 Orphinus congoanus Pic, 1950
 Orphinus conjunctus Pic, 1937
 Orphinus convexus Pic, 1956
 Orphinus defectus Walker, 1858
 Orphinus demeyeri Háva, 2003
 Orphinus diversus Pic, 1928
 Orphinus fasciatus Matsumura & Yokoyama, 1928
 Orphinus fouqueti Pic, 1937
 Orphinus fulvipes Guérin-Méneville, 1838
 Orphinus funestus Arrow, 1915
 Orphinus globulicornis Reitter, 1908
 Orphinus guernei Pic, 1916
 Orphinus haemorrhoidalis Motschulsky, 1858
 Orphinus hartmanni Háva, 2001
 Orphinus horni Pic, 1927
 Orphinus incognitus Háva, 2003
 Orphinus infasciatus Pic, 1926
 Orphinus interioris Blackburn, 1891
 Orphinus japonicus Arrow, 1915
 Orphinus jiri Háva, 2001
 Orphinus jucundus Arrow, 1915
 Orphinus kabateki Háva, 2007
 Orphinus katerina Háva, 2001
 Orphinus kejvali Háva, 2006
 Orphinus kenyensis Kalík, 1965
 Orphinus kresli Háva, 2003
 Orphinus malabarensis Pic, 1916
 Orphinus mediojunctus Pic, 1938
 Orphinus minimus Arrow, 1915
 Orphinus minor Arrow, 1915
 Orphinus mroczkowskii Háva & Kadej, 2006
 Orphinus nealense Blackburn, 1903
 Orphinus nesioticus Beal, 1961
 Orphinus nilgirensis Arrow, 1915
 Orphinus notaticollis Pic, 1916
 Orphinus obliteratus Pic, 1927
 Orphinus occidentalis Armstrong, 1943
 Orphinus okinawanus Háva, 2006
 Orphinus orientalis Motschulsky, 1851
 Orphinus oscitans Olliff, 1883
 Orphinus ovalis Arrow, 1915
 Orphinus pedestris Motschulsky, 1858
 Orphinus pseudoovalis Háva, 2004
 Orphinus quadrimaculatus Matsumura & Yokoyama, 1928
 Orphinus quornensis Blackburn, 1895
 Orphinus rufofasciatus Pic, 1924
 Orphinus rusumoensis Háva & Herrmann, 2003
 Orphinus sexmaculatus Arrow, 1915
 Orphinus sikkimensis Háva & Herrmann, 2004
 Orphinus subfasciatus Pic, 1927
 Orphinus tabitha Arrow, 1915
 Orphinus tadzhicus Zhantiev, 1975
 Orphinus terminalis Sharp in Blackburn & Sharp, 1885
 Orphinus testaceipes Pic, 1915
 Orphinus tonkineus Pic, 1922
 Orphinus unifasciatus Háva, 2006
 Orphinus wagneri Háva & Herrmann, 2003
 Orphinus woodvillensis Blackburn, 1891
 Orphinus yunnanus Háva, 2004
 Orphinus zomba Háva & Herrmann, 2002

References

Dermestidae genera